The ansa cervicalis (or ansa hypoglossi in older literature) is a loop of nerves that are part of the cervical plexus.  It lies superficial to the internal jugular vein in the carotid triangle. Its name means "handle of the neck" in Latin.

Branches from the ansa cervicalis innervate most of the infrahyoid muscles, including the sternothyroid muscle, sternohyoid muscle and the omohyoid muscle. Note that the thyrohyoid muscle, which is also an infrahyoid muscle and the geniohyoid muscle which is a suprahyoid muscle are innervated by cervical spinal nerve 1 via the hypoglossal nerve.

Roots
Two roots make up the ansa cervicalis, a superior root, and an inferior root.

The superior root of the ansa cervicalis is formed from cervical spinal nerve 1 of the cervical plexus. These nerve fibers travel in the hypoglossal nerve before separating in the carotid triangle to form the superior root.

The superior root goes around the occipital artery and then descends on the carotid sheath. It sends off branches to the superior belly of the omohyoid muscle, and the upper parts of the sternothyroid and sternohyoid muscles and is then joined by the inferior root.

The inferior root of the ansa cervicalis, also known as descendens cervicalis, is formed by fibers from spinal nerves C2 and C3.

The inferior root gives off branches to the inferior belly of the omohyoid muscle, and the lower parts of the sternothyroid and sternohyoid muscles.

Additional images

References
 "Ansa cervicalis." Stedman's Medical Dictionary, 27th ed. (2000). 
 Gray's Anatomy: The Anatomical Basis of Clinical Practice. (2005).

External links
 
 Photo and description at Tufts University
 
 https://web.archive.org/web/20080304085514/http://www.med.mun.ca/anatomyts/nerve/cerplex.htm

Nerves of the head and neck